Elizabeth Campbell is an Australian poet.

Biography
Elizabeth Campbell was born in Melbourne in 1980.
She graduated from the University of Melbourne with an Honours Degree in English in 2000. She has taught English at Eltham High School and The Mac. Robertson Girls' High School, Victoria.

She has published two collections of verse, Letters to the Tremulous Hand and Error, both published by John Leonard Press.

Her poetry has been widely published and anthologised, and she been the recipient of many awards and residencies for her poetry.

Several of Campbell's poems were included in the 2011 landmark anthology of Australian poetry, Australian Poetry Since 1788.

Works

Poetry
Letters to the Tremulous Hand. (Melbourne: John Leonard Press, 2007)
Error. (Melbourne: John Leonard Press, 2011)

Anthologies
The Puncher and Wattman Anthology of Australian Poetry. (Sydney: Puncher & Wattmann, 2010)
Australian Poetry Since 1788. Geoffrey Lehmann (ed.), Robert Gray (ed.) (Sydney: UNSW Press, 2011)
Young Poets: An Australian Anthology. (Melbourne: John Leonard Press, 2011)

Awards
 Gwen Harwood Poetry Prize, 2006
 Vincent Buckley Poetry Prize, 2010

References

External links 
Elizabeth Campbell at The Redroom Company
Black Inc, The Best Australian Poems 2010
UNSW Press, Australian Poetry Since 1788

1980 births
Living people
21st-century Australian poets
Australian women poets
21st-century Australian women writers